Roman Gomola (born December 8, 1973) is a Czech bobsledder who has competed since 1995. His best Bobsleigh World Cup finish was third in the two-man event at Cortina d'Ampezzo in January 2007.

Gomola also finished 14th in the four-man and 16th in the two-man events at the 2006 Winter Olympics in Turin.

His best finish at the FIBT World Championships was ninth in the two-man event at St. Moritz in 2007.

References

External links
FIBT profile

1973 births
Bobsledders at the 2002 Winter Olympics
Bobsledders at the 2006 Winter Olympics
Czech male bobsledders
Olympic bobsledders of the Czech Republic
Living people